Sogpelcé, Thyou is a town in the Thyou Department of Boulkiemdé Province in central western Burkina Faso. It has a population of 4,078.

References

Populated places in Boulkiemdé Province